Krasimir Krastev (born 10 January 1910, date of death unknown) was a Bulgarian sailor. He competed in the Tornado event at the 1980 Summer Olympics.

References

External links
 

1910 births
Year of death missing
Bulgarian male sailors (sport)
Olympic sailors of Bulgaria
Sailors at the 1980 Summer Olympics – Tornado
Place of birth missing